Alfred Fontville de Breanski Jr. (28 August 1877 – 17 April 1957) was a British painter.

Born in London, he was the son of Alfred de Breanski and Annie Roberts, both painters. He learnt his craft from his parents and at St. Martin’s School of Art, and met and became acquainted with Whistler during his time in France.  He often worked in a similar style to his father, though they each have distinctive signatures. His paintings were exhibited at the Royal Academy and at the Royal Society of British Artists.  He generally painted natural landscape and rustic scenes, showing the influence of Impressionism in his later life.

He also produced in 1915  a couple of posters for the Underground Electric Railways Company  showing Twickenham by Tram and Kew Gardens by Tram.

He died in Tonbridge, Kent, in 1957.

References

English landscape painters
1877 births
1957 deaths